Rembrandt is a 1942 German historical drama film directed by Hans Steinhoff and starring Ewald Balser, Hertha Feiler, Gisela Uhlen, and Aribert Wäscher. It was based on the novel Zwischen Hell und Dunkel by Valerian Tornius and depicts the life of the Dutch painter Rembrandt.

The film's sets were designed by the art director Walter Röhrig. It was shot at the Tempelhof and Babelsberg Studios in Berlin. Location shooting took place in German-occupied Amsterdam and the Cinetone Studios in the city were also used.

Main cast
 Ewald Balser as Rembrandt
 Hertha Feiler as Saskia van Rijn
 Gisela Uhlen as Hendrickje Stoffels
 Elisabeth Flickenschildt as Geertje Dierks
 Theodor Loos as Jan Six
 Aribert Wäscher as Uylenburgh, Saskia's relative
 Paul Henckels as Radierer Seeghers
 Hildegard Grethe as Ms. Seeghers
 Wilfried Seyferth as Ulricus Vischer
 Paul Rehkopf as brother Adriaen
 Rolf Weih as student Eeckhout
 Clemens Hasse as student Philip
 Helmut Weiss as student Cornelis
 Heinrich Schroth as doctor Tulp
 Robert Bürkner as notary Wilkens
 Karl Dannemann as Banning Cocq
 Walther Süssenguth as Piet

References

Bibliography

External links

1942 films
Films of Nazi Germany
1940s biographical drama films
1940s historical drama films
German historical drama films
Films about Rembrandt
1940s German-language films
German biographical drama films
Films based on German novels
Films directed by Hans Steinhoff
Films set in the 1640s
Films set in the 1650s
Films set in the 1660s
Films set in the Netherlands
Films set in Amsterdam
Films shot in Amsterdam
German black-and-white films
Terra Film films
Films shot at Babelsberg Studios
Films shot at Tempelhof Studios
1940s German films